Yıldız Moran (24 July 1932 – 15 April 1995) was a Turkish photographer who was active from 1950 to 1962. Her work has posthumously been shown in solo exhibitions at Pera Museum and at İstanbul Modern in Istanbul, and is held in the collection of the latter.

Life and work
Moran attended Robert College in Istanbul, leaving in her senior year. Following the advice of her uncle, art historian , she then moved to the UK and studied photography at Bloomsbury Technical College in London, and later at Ealing Technical College.

She was active as a photographer from 1950 to 1962, when she gave up photography for lexicography.

Moran married poet Özdemir Asaf in 1963 and had three children in four years.

Publications
Fotoğrafcı. Istanbul: Adam, 1998. . Exhibition catalogue.
Yıldız Moran: Zamansız Fotoğraflar / Timeless Photographs. Istanbul: Pera Museum, 2013. . Exhibition catalogue. Text in Turkish and English.
Yıldız Moran. Eczacıbaşı Photographers Series. Istanbul: Eczacıbaşi, 2017. Edited by Merih Akoğul. . A retrospective. Text in Turkish and English.

Exhibitions
Timeless Photographs, Pera Museum, Istanbul, Turkey, 2013/14
Yıldız Moran: A Mountain Tale, İstanbul Modern, Istanbul, Turkey, 2019

Collections
Moran's work is held in the following permanent collection:
İstanbul Modern, Istanbul, Turkey

References

External links

1995 deaths
20th-century women photographers
Turkish women photographers
Photographers from Istanbul
1932 births